The Taça Brahma de Campeões,also known as Taça Brahma or Supercopa do Brasil de 1992 was a unofficial football super cup tournament held in the year of 1992. Instead of counting on the duel between the winner of the Brazilian league and the 1992 Copa do Brasil champions (SC Internacional), it brought together the winners of Série A and Série B (first and second level of Brazilian football) in that year. The name was offered by the sponsorship of the Ambev Brewery.

Participants

Match

External links

See also 

Supercopa do Brasil

References  

1992 in Brazilian football
Supercopa do Brasil